Guamal is a town and municipality of the Colombian department of Magdalena.

Administrative divisions 

The Municipality of Guanal is formed by 22 corregimientos and 31 veredas:

References

External links
 Guamal official website

Municipalities of Magdalena Department